The Nura (Nura) is a major watercourse of northeast-central Kazakhstan.

Course
From there, it flows southwest for almost  through a series of lakes, including Korgalzhyn, finally ending in the endorheic Lake Tengiz. The river's largest tributaries are the Sherubainura, Ulken Kundyzdy, and Akbastau rivers. It is heavily used for irrigation and municipal water supply.

Some of the canals water is directed into the Nura (a chute below the dam at ), replenishing this river.

The Samarkand Reservoir is constructed on the Nura downstream from the canal crossing (the dam is at ), providing a waterfront for the city of Temirtau.

Pollution
In 1972, an acetaldehyde factory in the city of Temirtau began to discharge large quantities of mercury waste into the river. Although the factory closed in 1997, large amounts of mercury remain in the river and the area around it. Most of the mercury is spread in alluvial soils for a  stretch from Temirtau to the Intumak Reservoir, where most of the pollution was trapped. There is an estimated  of contaminated soil surrounding the site. Ash from coal-fired power plants also pollutes the river.

See also
List of rivers of Kazakhstan

References

Rivers of Kazakhstan
Kazakh Uplands
Tengiz basin